The Malaysia men's national junior ice hockey team is the men's national under-20 ice hockey team of Malaysia. The team is controlled by the Malaysia Ice Hockey Federation, a member of the International Ice Hockey Federation. The team made its international debut in December 2017 and currently competes in the IIHF U20 Challenge Cup of Asia which it has won on two occasions.

History
The Malaysia men's national junior ice hockey team debuted at the 2018 IIHF U20 Challenge Cup of Asia in Kuala Lumpur, Malaysia. Their opening game of the tournament was against the Philippines which they won 11–0, currently the team's largest victory on record. Malaysia went on to win their other three games of the tournament against India, Kyrgyzstan and the United Arab Emirates, finishing first in the standings and winning the tournament. Forward Mohammad Hariz Mohammad Oryza Ananda was named the most valuable player after leading the scoring with 18 points. He was also selected as best Malaysian player of the tournament. Chee Ming Bryan Lim was named the tournament's best forward by the IIHF Directorate and Shahrul Ilyas Abdul Shukor finished as the leading goaltender with a save percentage of 97.56.

The following year Malaysia again hosted the IIHF U20 Challenge Cup of Asia in Kuala Lumpur. In their opening game Malaysia defeated the United Arab Emirates 14–3, equalling their largest recorded victory. Malaysia went on to win the tournament after defeating Kyrgyzstan and the Philippines and finishing first in the standings. Forwards Chee Ming Bryan Lim was named the most valuable player and Mohammad Hariz Mohammad Oryza Ananda was selected as the best Malaysian player of the tournament.

International competitions
2018 IIHF U20 Challenge Cup of Asia. Finish: 1st
2019 IIHF U20 Challenge Cup of Asia. Finish: 1st

Players and personnel

Current roster
For the 2019 IIHF U20 Challenge Cup of Asia

Current team staff
For the 2019 IIHF U20 Challenge Cup of Asia
Head coach: Andy Yew Ming Chang
Assistant coach: Wai Kin Brandon Tan
General Manager: Noor Hisham Yahaya

References

External links
Malaysia Ice Hockey Federation

Ice hockey in Malaysia
Junior national ice hockey teams
National ice hockey teams in Asia
Ice hockey